The Basra Memorial is a Commonwealth War Graves Commission war memorial near Zubayr, Iraq. The memorial commemorates 40,682 Commonwealth forces (99% Indians) members who died during the Mesopotamian Campaign, from the Autumn of 1914 to the end of August 1921, and whose graves are not known. The memorial was designed by Edward Prioleau Warren. It was unveiled by Gilbert Clayton on 27 March 1929. Originally located eight kilometres north of Basra, near the Shatt al-Arab River, it was moved southwest in 1997 to a battleground from the much more recent Gulf War.

The Telegraph reported on 10 November 2013 that the memorial had suffered vandalism, with some of its items missing which include the Cross of Remembrance and the bronze plaques from the Wall of Remembrance, carrying the names of the fallen.

The BBC reported that Colin Kerr, the Commonwealth War Graves Commission publicity director, said that a total of 30,000 Indian soldiers are not named on the Basra memorial, despite fallen British soldiers being named, only Indian officers are accorded with the honour. The deaths of the non-commissioned men are commemorated by regiment but simply as "and 258 other Indian soldiers" or "and 272 other Indian soldiers." Kerr added that the commission knows their identities and has launched a project to find ways to publicise them both in India and in Britain.

See also
Amara War Cemetery
Basra War Cemetery

References

Commonwealth War Graves Commission memorials
Middle Eastern theatre of World War I
Buildings and structures completed in 1929